Ivan Alexandrovich Fullon (July 23 (Aug. 4), 1844 – 1920) was an Imperial Russian division and corps commander. He participated in the suppression of the rebellion in Poland and the war against the Ottoman Empire.

Awards
Order of Saint Anna, 4th class, 1863
Order of Saint Vladimir, 4th class, 1880
Order of Saint Stanislaus (House of Romanov), 2nd class, 1885
Order of Saint Anna, 2nd class, 1888
Order of Saint Vladimir, 3rd class, 1893
Order of Saint Stanislaus (House of Romanov), 1st class, 1896
Order of Saint Anna, 1st class, 1904
Order of Saint Vladimir, 2nd class (December 6, 1910)
Order of the White Eagle (Russian Empire), 1912
Order of Saint Alexander Nevsky (December 6, 1914)

Foreign decorations
Order of the Red Eagle, 3rd class, 1875
Ludwig Order, 1875
Order of the Red Eagle, 2nd class, 1890

Sources
 Официальный портал администрации Петербурга
 

1844 births
1920 deaths
Russian people of the January Uprising
Russian military personnel of the Russo-Turkish War (1877–1878)
Recipients of the Order of St. Anna, 4th class
Recipients of the Order of St. Vladimir, 4th class
Recipients of the Order of Saint Stanislaus (Russian), 2nd class
Recipients of the Order of St. Anna, 2nd class
Recipients of the Order of St. Vladimir, 3rd class
Recipients of the Order of Saint Stanislaus (Russian), 1st class
Recipients of the Order of St. Anna, 1st class
Recipients of the Order of St. Vladimir, 2nd class
Recipients of the Order of the White Eagle (Russia)
Mayors of places in the Russian Empire